Pogradec Castle is a ruined castle in Pogradec, eastern Albania.

References

Castles in Albania
Buildings and structures in Pogradec